Ali Rouabah as Braham (1 January 1897 – 31 December 1971) was an Algerian Member of Municipal council for Blida who was recognised as the 1st official President of USM Blida from 1 October 1933 until 22 June 1936.

References

L'Écho d'Alger 1932
Le Tell 1933
Le Tell 1933
Le Tell 1935
La Dépêche algérienne 1935
L'Echo d'Alger 1935
Le Tell 1936
Le Tell 1937

External links

1897 births
1971 deaths
People from Blida
Algerian businesspeople